ERAM is an FAA program.

ERAM or eRAM or Eram may also refer to:

ERAMS, a form of electronic library service
SM-6 Standard ERAM, an American missile under development
Eram, Mahmudabad, a village in Mazandaran Province, Iran
Eram, Neka, a village in Mazandaran Province, Iran
Eram District, an administrative subdivision of Iran
Eram Garden, a botanical garden in Shiraz, Iran
Eram, Oklahoma, a populated location in Okmulgee County, Oklahoma in the United States.
Electronic Research Archive for Mathematics
eRAM, embedded random-access memory 
, a French clothing shop chain
ERAM, an open source ram disk software